Udi Hanoun (born 28 February 1987) is a former Israeli professional football (soccer) player. During his career he played for Ironi Nir Ramat HaSharon, Hapoel Petah Tikva, Hapoel Nazareth Illit, Hapoel Jerusalem, Hapoel Herzliya and Beitar Kfar Saba. At international level, Hanoun was capped at levels from under-17 to under-19.

References

1987 births
Living people
Israeli Jews
Israeli footballers
Association football defenders
Hapoel Jerusalem F.C. players
Hakoah Maccabi Amidar Ramat Gan F.C. players
Hapoel Nir Ramat HaSharon F.C. players
Hapoel Petah Tikva F.C. players
Hapoel Herzliya F.C. players
Beitar Kfar Saba F.C. players
Israeli Premier League players
Liga Leumit players
Maccabiah Games medalists in football
Maccabiah Games gold medalists for Israel
21st-century Israeli people